Storckiella is a genus of four recognised species of trees, of the plant family Fabaceae.  It belongs to the subfamily Dialioideae. They grow naturally in New Caledonia, Fiji and Australia.

Those four recognised species, and for one of them two subspecies, are:
 Storckiella australiensis  – endemic to the luxuriant rainforests of the Queensland Wet Tropics lowlands (max. ca. ), Australia
 Storckiella neocaledonica  – a New Caledonia endemic
  Storckiella pancheri  Synonym: Storckiella comptonii 
 subsp. acuta  – a New Caledonia endemic
 subsp. pancheri – a New Caledonia endemic
 Storckiella vitiensis  – a Fiji endemic

References

Dialioideae
Fabaceae genera
Taxonomy articles created by Polbot